Yesterday is a 2002 science fiction/action movie set in a unified Korean peninsula in the year 2020. The movie stars Kim Seung-woo, Yunjin Kim and Choi Min-soo.

Plot
Yun Suk, an experienced agent from the Special Investigations Unit (SI or SIU) tries to locate and take down a serial killer, who is known only by the alias "Goliath" (taken from the Bible). His investigation, however, becomes a bit personal after Goliath instigates an incident that results in the death of his son, Hanbyul.

After Kim Hisu, the daughter of the Korean National Police Agency commissioner gets kidnapped by armed terrorists during a raid, the two work together to investigate Goliath's motives, which has something to do with a secret project formerly funded by the South Korean Defense Ministry.

Notes

External links 

2002 films
2000s Korean-language films
Films set in 2020
South Korean science fiction action films
2002 science fiction action films
2000s South Korean films